The 2017 Monterrey Open was a women's tennis tournament played on outdoor hard courts. It was the 8th edition of the Monterrey Open and an International tournament on the 2017 WTA Tour. It took place at the Club Sonoma in Monterrey, Mexico, from 3 to 9 April, 2017.

Points and prize money

Point distribution

Prize money 

*per team

Singles main draw entrants

Seeds 

1 Rankings as of 20 March 2017.

Other entrants 
The following players received wildcards into the main draw:
  Ekaterina Makarova
  Francesca Schiavone 
  Renata Zarazúa 

The following players received entry from the qualifying draw:
  Kristie Ahn 
  Lesley Kerkhove 
  Tereza Martincová 
  Nadia Podoroska

Withdrawals 
Before the tournament
  Nicole Gibbs  →replaced by  Patricia Maria Țig
  Monica Niculescu →replaced by  Denisa Allertová
  Risa Ozaki →replaced by  Alison Van Uytvanck

Doubles main draw entrants

Seeds 

 Rankings as of March 20, 2017.

Other entrants 
The following pairs received wildcards into the doubles main draw:
  Jovana Jakšić /  Marcela Zacarías 
  Victoria Rodríguez  /  Ana Sofía Sánchez

Champions

Singles 

  Anastasia Pavlyuchenkova def.  Angelique Kerber, 6–4, 2–6, 6–1

Doubles 

  Nao Hibino /  Alicja Rosolska def.  Dalila Jakupović /  Nadiia Kichenok, 6–2, 7–6(7–4)

References

External links 
 Official website

2017 WTA Tour
2017
2017 in Mexican tennis
April 2017 sports events in Mexico